Alpe di Neggia (el. 1395 m.) is a high mountain pass in the Swiss Alps in the canton of Ticino in Switzerland.

It connects Vira and Indemini. The pass lies in the saddle between Monte Tamaro and Monte Gambarogno. The maximum grade of the pass road is 12 percent.

See also
 List of highest paved roads in Europe
 List of mountain passes

References

External links

Mountain passes of Ticino
Mountain passes of the Alps